Nematogenys inermis is a species of mountain catfish, the only extant species in the family Nematogenyiidae. This species is endemic to Chile where it is found in fresh waters in central Chile.  This species grows to a length of  NG.

The body is naked (without scales) and elongated. The three pairs of barbels are the chin (mental) barbels, maxillary barbels, and nasal barbels. No adipose fin is present. The opercle lacks spines.

The Nematogenyidae and Trichomycteridae are sister groups that together form a clade sister to the families Callichthyidae, Scoloplacidae, Astroblepidae, and Loricariidae.

One extinct species, Nematogenys cuivi, has been described in this genus.

References

Endemic fauna of Chile
Catfish of South America
Fish described in 1848